British Eagle International Air Lines Ltd v Cie Nationale Air France [1975] 1 WLR 758 is a UK insolvency law case, concerning priority of creditors in a company winding up.

Facts
A number of airlines agreed to set up a clearing house to manage debt and credit accounts among themselves. Each airline in the group owed multiple and changing debts to one another, so to make settlements easier, participants were not meant to claim against one another, but simply enter their transactions in the clearing house, and then settle the balance at the end of each month. The clearing house fell under the authority of the International Air Transport Association, or IATA. British Eagle went into liquidation, and owed money to the clearing house overall, but was a creditor to Air France. The liquidator attempted to recover the money from Air France and Air France argued it was bound by the clearing house scheme, and could only collect money after netting out the claims of creditors of British Eagle in IATA. So the liquidator challenged the legality of the scheme, as it purported to sidestep the mandatory rules on pari passu distribution.

Judgment
The majority of the House of Lords (Lord Cross of Chelsea, Lord Diplock and Lord Edmund-Davies) held that the clearing house scheme could not put Air France in a better position than it would be, and could not have the effect of avoiding the insolvency priority rules, which would be against public policy. It was unlawful to attempt to contract out of (what is now) the Insolvency Act 1986, section 107. Therefore, the majority in the House of Lords ruled in favour of the liquidators of British Eagle.

Lord Cross gave the leading opinion.

Lord Morris of Borth-Y-Gest and Lord Simon of Glaisdale gave dissenting judgments.

See also

UK insolvency law
Re Jeavons, ex parte Mackay (1873) LR 8 Ch App 643

Notes

References
L Sealy and S Worthington, Cases and Materials in Company Law (8th edn OUP 2008) 676-677

United Kingdom company case law
United Kingdom insolvency case law
House of Lords cases
British Eagle
1975 in case law
1975 in British law
Air France–KLM